Blackout Improv is an improvisational comedy theatre troupe in Minneapolis, Minnesota. Founded in 2015, the cast is completely black. Topics of monthly comedy performances include standard improv audience suggestions as well as a special focus on civil rights issues like police brutality, white privilege, and cultural appropriation. Blackout Improv responded to the shooting of Jamar Clark as well as the acquittal of police officer Jeronimo Yanez after the shooting of Philando Castile.

Blackout Improv, along with efforts like the Black and Funny Improv Festival, are bringing more people of color to Twin Cities improv theater. Blackout Improv performs at the Mixed Blood Theatre in Cedar-Riverside, Minneapolis.

References

Improvisational troupes
Theatre companies in Minneapolis
African-American theatre companies
Black theatre
2015 establishments in Minnesota